Elizabeth Richardson  may refer to:

Elizabeth Richardson, 1st Lady Cramond (1576/77 – 1651), English writer and peeress
Elizabeth Ann Richardson (1918–1945), Red Cross Clubmobiler
Elizabeth Hadley Richardson, wife of Ernest Hemingway

See also
Richardson (surname)